Jace Miller is a poet based in San Diego, California. He was born in Houston, Texas and grew up in and around New York City. His poems have been published on both sides of the Atlantic.

Journals featuring poetry by Jace Miller include Alehouse 2007, Bathtub Gin, The Cortland Review, The Iconoclast, iota poetry quarterly, The Iowa Review, New Letters: A Magazine of Writing and Art and Oberon.
 
Mr. Miller currently lives and writes poetry in Santa Barbara, California close to the ocean where he feels most at home.

References

External links
Word Riot: "Two Poems"

American male poets
Living people
Poets from California
Year of birth missing (living people)